Zsolt Máriási (born 14 October 1967 in Ózd) is a retired Hungarian international football midfielder.

He played most of his career with Videoton FC. In the early 1990s he played for other Hungarian top league clubs such as Győri ETO FC, Diósgyőri VTK and Vasas SC. In 1997, he moved abroad to Croatia where he played one season with NK Osijek in Croatian First League.

Between 1988 and 1990 Zsolt Máriási played five matches for the Hungarian national team.

References

External sources
 

1967 births
Living people
People from Ózd
Hungarian footballers
Hungarian expatriate footballers
Hungary international footballers
Association football midfielders
Fehérvár FC players
Győri ETO FC players
Diósgyőri VTK players
Vasas SC players
NK Osijek players
Croatian Football League players
Expatriate footballers in Croatia
Sportspeople from Borsod-Abaúj-Zemplén County